Denny Vargas (born 12 August 1990) is a Dominican footballer who plays as a centre back and captains both Deportivo Claret and the Dominican Republic women's national team.

Club career
Vargas played for Barcelona Atlético and Distrito Nacional in the Dominican Republic, for Estudiantes de Guárico in Venezuela, for La Equidad in Colombia and for CB Junqueño in Puerto Rico.

International career
Vargas played for the Dominican Republic at senior level in the 2010 CONCACAF Women's World Cup Qualifying qualification, the 2012 CONCACAF Women's Olympic Qualifying Tournament qualification, the 2014 Central American and Caribbean Games and the 2018 CONCACAF Women's Championship qualification and the 2020 CONCACAF Women's Olympic Qualifying Championship qualification.

International goals
Scores and results list Dominican Republic's goal tally first.

References

External links

1990 births
Living people
People from Puerto Plata, Dominican Republic
Dominican Republic women's footballers
Women's association football central defenders
Club Barcelona Atlético players
La Equidad footballers
Dominican Republic women's international footballers
Competitors at the 2014 Central American and Caribbean Games
Dominican Republic expatriate women's footballers
Dominican Republic expatriate sportspeople in Venezuela
Expatriate women's footballers in Venezuela
Dominican Republic expatriate sportspeople in Colombia
Expatriate women's footballers in Colombia
Dominican Republic expatriate sportspeople in Puerto Rico
Expatriate women's footballers in Puerto Rico